The 1639 and 1640 Bishops' Wars were the first of the conflicts known collectively as the 1639 to 1653 Wars of the Three Kingdoms, which took place in Scotland, England and Ireland. Others include the Irish Confederate Wars, the First and Second English Civil Wars, the Anglo-Scottish war (1650–1652), and the Cromwellian conquest of Ireland.

The wars originated in disputes over governance of the Church of Scotland or kirk that began in the 1580s, and came to a head when Charles I attempted to impose uniform practices on the kirk and the Church of England in 1637. These were opposed by most Scots, who supported a Presbyterian church governed by ministers and elders. Signatories of the 1638 National Covenant pledged to oppose such "innovations", and were collectively known as Covenanters.

Although the Covenant made no reference to Bishops, these clergymen were seen as instruments of royal control and in December were expelled by the General Assembly of the Church of Scotland. The origin of the term "Bishops Wars", this action gave a political dimension to a conflict previously focused on religious practice. After the Covenanters took control of government following the 1639 war, the Scottish Parliament passed a series of acts that amounted to a constitutional revolution, confirmed by victory in 1640.

In order to protect that settlement, the Scots allied with sympathisers in Ireland and England, chiefly Puritans who objected to recent religious reforms, and wanted elections for a new Parliament of England, suspended since 1629. When Charles sought to reverse his defeat in 1640, the combination destabilised all three kingdoms, with the October 1641 Irish Rebellion followed by the First English Civil War in August 1642.

Background

The Protestant Reformation created a Church of Scotland, or 'The Kirk', Presbyterian in structure, and Calvinist in doctrine. While 'Presbyterian' and 'Episcopalian' now implies differences in both governance and doctrine, this was not the case in the 17th century. Episcopalian structures were governed by bishops, usually appointed by the monarch, Presbyterian by presbyters, elected by ministers and elders. Arguments over the role of bishops were as much about politics and the power of the monarch as religious practice.

The vast majority of Scots, whether Covenanter or Royalist, believed a 'well-ordered' monarchy was divinely mandated; they disagreed on what 'well-ordered' meant, and who held ultimate authority in clerical affairs. In general, Royalists viewed the monarch as head of both church and state, while Covenanters held this applied only to secular matters, and "Chryst Jesus...was King of the Kirk'. However, there were many other factors, including nationalist allegiance to the kirk, and individual motives were very complex; Montrose fought for the Covenant in 1639 and 1640, then became a Royalist, and switching sides was common throughout the period.

When James VI and I succeeded as king of England in 1603, he viewed a unified Church of Scotland and England as the first step in creating a centralised, Unionist state. This policy was adopted by his son, Charles I, but the two were very different in doctrine; many Scots, and English Puritans, considered Charles' reforms to the Church of England as essentially Catholic.

This mattered because fear of 'Popery' remained widespread, despite the fact that in Scotland it was restricted to parts of the aristocracy and the remote Highlands and Islands. Scots fought in the Thirty Years' War, one of the most destructive religious conflicts in European history, while Scotland had close economic and cultural links with the Dutch Republic, then fighting for independence from Catholic Spain. In addition, many had been educated in French Calvinist universities, which were suppressed in the 1620s.

A general perception Protestant Europe was under attack meant increased sensitivity to changes in church practice; in 1636, a new Book of Canons replaced John Knox's Book of Discipline and excommunicated anyone who denied the King's supremacy in church matters. When followed in 1637 by a new Book of Common Prayer, the result was anger and widespread rioting, said to have been set off with the throwing of a stool by Jenny Geddes during a service in St. Giles Cathedral. More recently, historians like Mark Kishlansky have argued her protest was part of a series of planned and co-ordinated opposition to the Prayer book, whose origin was as much political as it was religious.

In February 1638, representatives from all sections of Scottish society agreed a National Covenant, pledging resistance to liturgical 'innovations.' Support for the Covenant was widespread except in Aberdeenshire and Banff, heartland of Royalist and Episcopalian resistance for the next 60 years. The Marquess of Argyll and six other members of the Scottish Privy Council backed the Covenant.

Charles agreed to defer discussion of the new canons to the General Assembly of the Church of Scotland, but made it clear to his supporters he had no intention of making any concessions. Aware of this, when the Assembly gathered in Glasgow in December it rejected the changes, expelled bishops from the kirk, and affirmed its right to meet annually, not just when the King agreed. The Marquis of Hamilton, a prominent Scottish nobleman and Charles' chief advisor on Scottish affairs, advised the King that there was now no alternative to war.

1639; First Bishops' War

Charles decided to re-assert his authority by force, but preferred to rely on his own financial resources, rather than recalling Parliament. An English army of 20,000 would advance on Edinburgh from the south, while an amphibious force of 5,000 under the Marquis of Hamilton landed in Aberdeen, where it would link up with Royalist troops led by the Marquess of Huntly. Lastly, an Irish army under the Earl of Antrim would invade western Scotland from Carrickfergus, where he would join forces with the MacDonalds and other Royalist clans.

The plan was overly complex, and preparations were hampered by lack of funds, while many Englishmen were sympathetic to the Covenanter cause. The Scots quickly occupied Dumbarton, preventing any prospect of an Irish landing, while Montrose occupied Aberdeen in March, leaving Hamilton unable to disembark his troops. In April, Royalist leader Lord Banff re-occupied Aberdeen after two minor engagements; in one of these, the so-called Trot of Turriff, David Prat became the first casualty of the Wars of the Three Kingdoms.

The English army mustered at the border town of Berwick-upon-Tweed totalled some 15,000 men, but the vast majority were untrained conscripts from the northern trained bands or militia, many armed only with bows and arrows. Charles unsuccessfully tried to compensate for this by recruiting foreign mercenaries from the Spanish Netherlands, exposing him to accusations of using foreign Catholics against his own subjects. 

A Scottish army of 16,500 men under the experienced veteran Alexander Leslie, camped a few miles away on the other side of the border near Duns. Both sides included large numbers of professional soldiers who had served in the European wars, but the senior English commands went to Charles' favourites, who were largely inexperienced.

Charles joined his troops at Berwick on 30 May, announcing he would not invade Scotland, as long as the Covenanter army remained ten miles north of the border. Leslie advanced to Kelso, within the ten mile limit, but neither side was anxious to fight; on 11 June, negotiations began that ended in the Pacification of Berwick on 19 June. This agreed to refer all disputed questions to the General Assembly, or Parliament of Scotland, for resolution. However, both sides viewed this as a truce, and continued preparations for another military confrontation.

The only significant engagement of the war took place on 18 June, at the Battle of the Brig of Dee south of Aberdeen, between Royalist forces under Viscount Aboyne and Montrose. It resulted in a Covenanter victory, although casualties were minimal.

Interlude

The kirk's General Assembly met again in August 1639 and confirmed the decisions taken at Glasgow, which were then ratified by the Scottish Parliament. When Charles' representative, Lord Traquair, tried to suspend it, his action was declared illegal and Parliament continued to sit. A series of acts were passed which amounted to a constitutional revolution, including Tri-annual Parliaments, and making the Covenant compulsory for all holders of public office.

His advisors convinced Charles the only way to finance a second war was to recall the English Parliament, and in December 1639, he issued writs for the first time since 1629. Thomas Wentworth, 1st Earl of Strafford, his most capable advisor and Lord Deputy of Ireland also asked the Parliament of Ireland for funds; in March, they approved an army of 9,000 to suppress the Covenanters, despite violent opposition from their co-religionists in Ulster. This is an example of how the Bishops Wars destabilised all three kingdoms.

Charles hoped this would provide an example for the Short Parliament, which assembled in April; however, led by John Pym, Parliament demanded he address grievances like ship money before they would approve subsidies. After three weeks of stalemate. Charles dissolved Parliament; he would have to rely on his own resources to fund the war. Meanwhile, in January 1640 the Covenanter leaders mustered their regiments, and to secure their rear, occupied Aberdeen, centre of the Royalist north-east.

1640; Second Bishops' War

In June, the Scottish Parliament met in Edinburgh, and granted Argyll a commission of 'fire and sword' against Royalist areas in Lochaber, Badenoch and Rannoch. A force of 5,000 conducted this campaign with great brutality, burning and looting across a large area, one of the most infamous acts being the destruction of Airlie Castle. By seizing Dumbarton Castle, they also prevented Strafford's Irish army from landing in Scotland, allowing them to focus on the threatened English invasion.

The Scottish army was led by Alexander Leslie, an experienced veteran who had served with the Swedes in the Thirty Years' War. It consisted of around 20,000 well-equipped men, and possessed vastly superior artillery compared to its opponents. The English troops consisted largely of militia from Southern England, poorly-equipped, unpaid, and unenthusiastic about the war. On the march north, lack of supplies meant they looted the areas they passed through, creating widespread disorder; several units murdered officers suspected of being Catholics, then deserted.

Lord Conway, the English commander in the north, focused on reinforcing Berwick-upon-Tweed, the usual starting point for invading England. On 17 August, cavalry units under Montrose crossed the River Tweed, followed by the rest of Leslie's army. The Scots bypassed the town, and headed for Newcastle-upon-Tyne, centre of the coal trade with London, and a valuable bargaining point.

On 28 August, the Scots forced a passage over the River Tyne at the Battle of Newburn; they still had to take Newcastle, but to Leslie's surprise, when they arrived on 30 August, Conway had withdrawn to Durham. One suggestion is he did not trust his ill-disciplined and mutinous troops, but morale in the rest of the army now collapsed, forcing Charles to make peace. The only other significant action of the war was the siege of Edinburgh Castle, held by the Royalist commander Sir Patrick Ruthven, who had previously served with Leslie in the Swedish army. Blockaded since the end of May, starvation forced him to surrender in September.

Aftermath
Under the truce negotiated in October 1640, the Scots were paid £850 per day and allowed to occupy Northumberland and County Durham until peace terms had been finalised. Many believed this arrangement was secretly agreed between the Parliamentary opposition and the Scots, since it allowed them to maintain pressure on London by controlling the export of coal from Newcastle, while only Parliament could levy the taxes needed to pay the occupation costs. The so-called Long Parliament that assembled in November 1640 asserted its power by executing Strafford in May 1641 and the Scots finally evacuated Northern England after the Treaty of London was signed in August. 

While defeat forced Charles to call a Parliament he could not get rid of, the Irish Rebellion of 1641 was arguably more significant in the struggle that led to war in August 1642. Both he and Parliament agreed on the need to suppress the revolt but neither trusted the other with control of the army raised to do so, and it was this tension that was the proximate cause of the First English Civil War. Victory confirmed Covenanter control of government and kirk, and Scottish policy now focused on securing these achievements. The 1643 Solemn League and Covenant was driven by concern over the implications for Scotland if Parliament were defeated; like Charles, the Covenanters sought political power through the creation of a unified church of Scotland and England, only one that was Presbyterian, rather than Episcopalian.

However, success in the Bishops Wars meant they overestimated their military capacity and ability to enforce this objective. Unlike Scotland, Presbyterians were a minority within the Church of England, while religious Independents opposed any state church, let alone one dictated by the Scots. One of their most prominent opponents was Oliver Cromwell, who claimed he would fight rather than agree to such an outcome. Many of the political radicals known as the Levellers, and much of the New Model Army, belonged to Independent congregations; by 1646, the Scots and their English allies viewed them as a greater threat than Charles. Defeat in the 1648 Second English Civil War resulted in his execution, while a failed invasion of England intended to restore his son in the Anglo-Scottish war (1650–1652) was followed by Scotland's incorporation into the Commonwealth, a union made on English terms.

References

Sources

Bibliography

 

 
 
 
 
 
 
 
 
 

1639 in Scotland
1640 in Scotland
17th-century military history of Scotland
Church of Scotland
Conflicts in 1639
Conflicts in 1640
Wars involving England
Wars involving Scotland
Wars of the Three Kingdoms